MD4, MD 4, MD-4 may refer to:

MD4 cryptographic hash function
Maryland's 4th congressional district
Maryland Route 4